The South African Music Awards (often simply the SAMAs) are the Recording Industry of South Africa's music industry awards, established in 1995. The ceremony is held in late-April or May every year, with the judging process starting in November of the previous year. The nominations are typically announced at the end of March. The winners receive a gold-plated statuette called a SAMA.

The show is consistently held at the Super Bowl in Sun City, with exception of two years, and broadcast live on national broadcaster, SABC. The ceremony features live performances by a selection of nominees. The SAMAs are considered the South African equivalent of the American Grammy Awards. MTN has been the title sponsor of the event since 2003.

1990s

2000s

2010s

References

South African Music Awards